Árbol adentro is an outdoor sculpture by José Fors, installed in Centro, Guadalajara, in the Mexican state of Jalisco.

References

Outdoor sculptures in Guadalajara